Jan Hoffman (11 June 1906 – 25 October 1995) was a Polish pianist and music educator.

Biography
Jan Hoffman was born in Kraków and studied with Józef Śliwiński and Wiktor Łabuński at the Conservatory of Music in Kraków, receiving a diploma in 1928. He continued his studies in Berlin with Egon Petri and worked in Lviv, teaching music at the school of Sabina Kasparek. After completing his studies, he took as position from 1931 to 1933 as professor in the Kraków Conservatory. Near the outbreak of World War II, he gave private lessons in Kraków, Bielsko and Lviv. In 1941 he was an associate professor in the Krakow Conservatory, but during the war years, he hid from the Nazis, teaching, performing and conducting works by contemporary Polish composers secretly.

After the war, Hoffman was among the co-founders of the State Higher School of Music in Kraków (after 1979 the Academy of Music), and served at the school in a number of position, including dean, department head, vice-rector and president from 1966 to 1968. He retired in 1978, but continued to teach, including master classes. He also served as jury member for a number of international piano competitions, and was active in the Association of Polish Artists and Musicians and the Frédéric Chopin Association, serving on the board of directors.

From 1926 to 1968, Hoffman worked in Polish Radio. He also edited a number of works for publication including a selection of songs. He died in Kraków.

Awards
Officer and Commander's Cross with Star of the Order of Polonia Restituta (1950) 
Order of the Banner of Labour 
Distinguished Teacher of the PRL
Minister of Culture and Art Award (1964, 1968, 1986)

References

1906 births
1995 deaths
20th-century Polish pianists
Polish music educators
Commanders with Star of the Order of Polonia Restituta
Musicians from Kraków
Recipients of the State Award Badge (Poland)